Thomas J. Welby is a Local Councillor who was the  Mayor of County Galway in 2012-13.

Welby served as Mayor of County Galway for the term 2012-2013. He was first elected as a county councillor on 11 June 2004, a year to the day after his father, Tom Welby, died. Welby Sr. served as a Fianna Fáil county councillor for seventeen years, rising to the position of Leas-Chathaoirleach/Vice-Chairperson of the council.

Welby joined the Progressive Democrats in 2003 but resigned in 2008, running as an independent in the 2009 Local Elections, topping the poll in the Connemara Electoral Area. He repeated his poll topping performance in the same Electoral Area, now renamed the Connemara Municipal District in the 2014 Local Elections.

External links
 http://galwayindependent.com/stories/item/3198/2012-29/Thomas-Welby,-Mayor-of-County-Galway
 http://www.galwaynews.ie/26249-oughterards-tom-welby-new-mayor-county-galway

Politicians from County Galway
Living people
Independent politicians in Ireland
Local councillors in County Galway
Year of birth missing (living people)